Fontaine-lès-Dijon is a commune in the Côte-d'Or department in eastern France.
It is known for the Couvent et Basilique Saint-Bernard, a collection of buildings on the site of the birthplace of Saint Bernard of Clairvaux.

Population

See also
Communes of the Côte-d'Or department

References

External links

Official site

Fontainelesdijon